Mill Woods Town Centre is a shopping centre located in south Edmonton, Alberta, Canada in the neighbourhood of Mill Woods. It contains service and retail including North Central CO-OP and Shoppers Drug Mart. Some surrounding satellite stores are located in and around the mall's exterior properties. Stores inside the mall include Tim Hortons,M&M Meat Shops Ltd.,Alberta Works Support Service Center, Telus Mobility, and more. There is also an ETS transit centre on the northern side of the property.

History
Development for the mall started in the late 1970s; it was designed so that people would not have to leave Mill Woods to get access to major department stores. In 2012, Zellers closed to become Target. In 2013, Safeway closed and became a Co-op. The Edmonton Public Library branch closed in 2015 and moved to a nearby location.

In 2017, building owner RioCan announced a plan to redevelop the site over the next 25 years, which would include a new transit station to serve the upcoming Mill Woods LRT station and two new 18-story residential towers.

Transit
The Mill Woods Transit Centre is located on the east side of the mall on Hewes Way.

See also
List of Edmonton malls

References

External links

Shopping malls in Edmonton
Shopping malls established in 1988